Ahmed Sabry (15 September 1933 – 14 August 1958) was an Egyptian fencing champion. He was one of the six members of the Egyptian team that perished on board KLM Flight 607-E - the Hugo de Groot on 14 August 1958.

Personal life
Sabry had two sisters; Laila, who died at the age of 5, and Isis who was married to the Olympic fencer Osman Abdel Hafeez.

References

1933 births
1958 deaths
Egyptian male fencers
Victims of aviation accidents or incidents in international waters
Victims of aviation accidents or incidents in 1958
20th-century Egyptian people